Yes, Women are Dangerous (German: Ja, die Frauen sind gefährlich or Ich zähle täglich meine Sorgen) is a 1960 West German musical comedy film directed by Paul Martin and starring Peter Alexander, Ingeborg Schöner and Gunther Philipp.

The film's sets were designed by the art directors Dieter Bartels, Mathias Matthies and Ellen Schmidt. It was shot at the Bendestorf Studios outside Hamburg.

Cast

Soundtrack 
Peter Alexander and Orchestra Kurt Edelhagen – "Bim-Bam Bumerang" (Written by Heinz Gietz and Kurt Feltz)
Peter Alexander and Orchestra Kurt Edelhagen – "Nimm mich mit nach Cheriko (Take Me Back To Cheriko)" (Written by Heinz Gietz and Kurt Feltz)
Peter Alexander and Orchestra Erich Werner – "Ich zähle täglich meine Sorgen" (Written by Harlan Howard and Jean Nicolas)
Peter Alexander and Orchestra Kurt Edelhagen – "Mariana" (Written by Heinz Gietz and Kurt Feltz)

References

Bibliography
 Susan Ingram, Leen dHaenens & Katrina Sark. Berliner Chic: A Locational History of Berlin Fashion. Intellect Books, 2011.

External links 

1960 films
1960 musical comedy films
German musical comedy films
West German films
1960s German-language films
Films directed by Paul Martin
Films set on ships
Constantin Film films
1960s German films